Irina M. Artemieva is a Russian earth scientist who is a professor at the GEOMAR Helmholtz Centre for Ocean Research Kiel. She holds a joint position as a Distinguished Professor at the China University of Geosciences. Her research looks to understand the processes that govern the evolution and dynamic topography of the lithosphere. She is the editor-in-chief of the Journal of Geodynamics, and the incoming President of the European Geosciences Union.

Early life and education 
Artemieva was an undergraduate student at the Lomonosov Moscow State University, where she studied physics. She moved to the Institute of Physics of the Earth in Moscow for doctoral research, before moving to the Uppsala University as an associate research professor.

Research and career 
In 2005, Artemieva was appointed an associate professor at the University of Copenhagen. Her career has focused on understanding the continental lithosphere. Her research combines laboratory measurements with thermal models and seismic measurements. She developed a model that describes the thermal and compositional structure, and how this relates to the lithosphere's age and physical properties. She was the first to propose strategies to evaluate changes in the chemical composition and thickness of the lithosphere. Artemieva was coordinator of the International Lithosphere Program's EUROPROBE program, which involved hundreds of scientists from across Europe. When she was elected Fellow of the Geological Society of America in 2012, she was the first person in a Danish university to receive the honour.

Artemieva left the University of Copenhagen in 2019.

Artemieva has also focused on training the next-generation of researchers. She has held leadership positions within the European Geosciences Union, including serving on the council. In 2022, Artemieva was elected President of the European Geosciences Union.

Awards and honours 
 2000 Elected Fellow of the Royal Astronomical Society
 2007 Elected Member of the Academia Europaea
 2012 Elected Fellow of the Geological Society of America
 2014 Elected Member of the Royal Danish Academy of Sciences and Letters
 2018 Elected Member of International Eurasian Academy of Sciences
 2021 European Geosciences Union Augustus Love Medal

Selected publications

References 

Living people
Moscow State University alumni
Academic staff of Uppsala University
Academic staff of the University of Copenhagen
Russian earth scientists
European Geosciences Union
Fellows of the Geological Society of America
Fellows of the Royal Astronomical Society
Academia Europaea
Royal Danish Academy of Sciences and Letters
Structure of the Earth
Year of birth missing (living people)